Emerald is a song by Thin Lizzy from their 1976 album Jailbreak. It is inspired by traditional Irish music and utilizes a 6/8 rhythm. The guitar riff uses an "Irish" melody with its use of triplets.

Reception
Ultimate Classic Rock praised the guitar solo and said it "sends the album off on a high note with a thoroughly satisfying extended guitar duel".

Personnel 
Phil Lynott – vocals, bass guitar

Scott Gorham – lead and rhythm guitar

Brian Robertson – lead and rhythm guitar 

Brian Downey – drums

Other versions
Mastodon released a cover version of the song in 2003. 

Slash and former Kiss guitarist Ace Frehley did a version of the song on the 2016 album Origins, Vol. 1. According to Rolling Stone magazine, Slash and Frehley played the song together 15 times in order to perform the song right.

References

Thin Lizzy songs
1976 songs
Songs written by Phil Lynott
Songs written by Brian Robertson (guitarist)
Songs written by Scott Gorham